In the mathematics of structural rigidity, grid bracing is a problem of adding cross bracing to a square grid to make it into a rigid structure. It can be solved optimally by translating it into a problem in graph theory on the connectivity of bipartite graphs.

Problem statement

The problem considers a framework in the form of a square grid, with  rows and  columns of squares. The grid has  edges, each of which has unit length and is considered to be a rigid rod, free to move continuously within the Euclidean plane but unable to change its length. These rods are attached to each other by flexible joints at the  vertices of the grid. A valid
continuous motion of this framework is a way of continuously varying the placement of its edges and joints into the plane in such a way that they keep the same lengths and the same attachments, but without requiring them to form squares. Instead, each square of the grid may be deformed to form a rhombus, and the whole grid may form an irregular structure with a different shape for each of its faces, as shown in the figure.

Unlike squares, triangles made of rigid rods and flexible joints cannot change their shapes: any two triangles with sides of the same lengths must be congruent (this is the SSS postulate). If a square is cross-braced by adding one of its diagonals as another rigid bar, the diagonal divides it into two triangles which similarly cannot change shape, so the square must remain square through any continuous motion of the cross-braced framework. (The same framework could also be placed in the plane in a different way, by folding its two triangles onto each other over their shared diagonal, but this folded placement cannot be obtained by a continuous motion.) Similarly, if all squares of the given grid were cross-braced in the same way, the grid could not change shape; its only continuous motions would be to rotate it or translate it as a single rigid body. However, this method of making the grid rigid, by adding cross-braces to all its squares, uses many more cross-braces than necessary. The grid bracing problem asks for a description of the minimal sets of cross-braces that have the same effect, of making the whole framework rigid.

Graph theoretic solution

As  originally observed, the grid bracing problem can be translated into a problem in graph theory by considering an undirected bipartite graph that has a vertex for each row and column of the given grid, and an edge for each cross-braced square of the grid. They proved that the cross-braced grid is rigid if and only if this bipartite graph is connected. It follows that the minimal cross-bracings of the grid correspond to the trees connecting all vertices in the graph, and that they have exactly  cross-braced squares. Any overbraced but rigid cross-bracing (with more than this number of cross-braced squares) can be reduced to a minimal cross-bracing by finding a spanning tree of its graph. More generally, the number of degrees of freedom in the shape of a cross-braced grid is equal to the number of connected components of the bipartite graph, minus one. If a partially braced grid is to be made rigid by cross-bracing more squares, the minimum number of additional squares that need to be cross-braced is this number of degrees of freedom, and a solution with this number of squares can be obtained by adding this number of edges to the bipartite graph, connecting pairs of its connected components so that after the addition there is only one remaining component.

Another version of the problem asks for a "double bracing", a set of cross-braces that is sufficiently redundant that it will stay rigid even if one of the diagonals is removed. This version allows both diagonals of a single square to be used, but it is not required to do so. In this version, a double bracing of a grid corresponds in the same way to an undirected bipartite multigraph that is connected and bridgeless (every edge belongs to at least one cycle). In the special case of grids with equal numbers of rows and columns, the only double bracings of this minimum size are Hamiltonian cycles, so determining whether one exists within a larger bracing is NP-complete. However, it is possible to approximate the smallest double bracing subset of a given bracing within a constant approximation ratio.

To make a single square rigid in this way, it is necessary to brace both of its diagonals, instead of just one diagonal. One can again represent such a bracing by a bipartite graph, which has an edge directed from a row vertex to a column vertex if the shared square of that row and column is braced by the positively-sloped diagonal, and an edge from a column vertex to a row vertex if the shared square is braced by the negatively-sloped diagonal. The braced structure is rigid if and only if the resulting graph is strongly connected. If not, additional bracing needs to be added to connect together its strongly connected components. The problem of finding a minimal set of additional braces to add is an instance of strong connectivity augmentation, and can be solved in linear time. According to Robbins' theorem, the undirected graphs that can be made strongly connected by directing their edges are exactly the bridgeless graphs; reinterpreting this theorem in terms of grid bracing, a bracing by rigid rods forms a double bracing if and only if its rods can be replaced by wires (possibly on the other diagonals of their squares) to form a rigid tension bracing.

References

External links

Mathematics of rigidity
Spanning tree
Application-specific graphs